"The 6th Sense" is the first single from Common's 2000 album Like Water for Chocolate and is a b-side of "The Light." It is produced by DJ Premier making it the only song on Common's 2000 album not produced by a member of the Soulquarians. It features Premier's trademark chorus with scratched samples; the samples are from "Memories Are Here to Stay" by The Intruders and "Allustrious" by Mobb Deep. The chorus also features singing by neo-soul artist Bilal. The song's lyrics discuss afrocentricity, hip hop culture and various social issues. "The 6th Sense" begins with an introduction in which Common states "the revolution will not be televised, the revolution is here" referencing the famous Gil-Scott Heron song named "The Revolution Will Not Be Televised."

A music video directed by Andrew Dosunmu was made for "The 6th Sense." The video features Common rapping in a stationary car alongside Bilal, while chaos ensues outside of the car.

Critical reception
"The 6th Sense" has received positive recognition from multiple sources: Mark Anthony Neal of PopMatters considers it to be a classic song and Common's best single besides "I Used to Love H.E.R." Allmusic writer Steve Huey considers "The 6th Sense" as well as "The Light" as "quintessential Common, uplifting and thoughtful [songs that] helped bring him a whole new audience." Rashaun Hall of BarnesAndNoble.com says that "[t]he freestyle-sounding lead single [...] showcases Common's fluid flow backed by a dense, DJ Premier beat that knocks harder than the NYPD." Pitchfork Media writer Taylor Clark declares that on "The 6th Sense," "Common gets iller than Syphilis over an addictive track supplied by Gang Starr's DJ Premier."

These positive remarks may have contributed to its chart positions: #87 on the Hot R&B/Hip-Hop Singles & Tracks chart and #14 on the Hot Rap Singles chart.

There is a popular remix of the song produced by 9th Wonder, which utilizes the same scratches by DJ Premier, and can be found on many P2P networks as a free download. The remix was featured on some of 9th Wonder's remix compilations as well.

Track listing

A-side
 "The 6th Sense (Album Version)"
 "The 6th Sense (Instrumental)"
 "The 6th Sense (Acapella)"

B-side
 "Dooinit (Album Version)"
 "Dooinit (Instrumental)"

Chart positions

References

See also

List of Common songs

2000 singles
Bilal (American singer) songs
Common (rapper) songs
Song recordings produced by DJ Premier
1999 songs
Songs written by Common (rapper)
MCA Records singles
Songs written by DJ Premier
Songs written by Prodigy (rapper)
Songs written by Havoc (musician)
Songs written by Bilal (American singer)